"Falling Away" is the lead single from Marion Raven's album, 'Set Me Free', digitally released on April 11, 2007 to Canada and European iTunes by Eleven Seven Music. The song was released in the digital format to U.S. iTunes on June 12, 2007. The single has two covers, one for European countries and the alternative cover for its U.S. release. The single was released on radio in most Asian countries despite the album being exclusively released in the U.S and Europe; it had reached number 2 in Indonesia by the end of 2007.

Content
According to Raven, "Falling Away" describes how things can get out of one's control, and it is also about the fear of both life and death.

Music video and snowboarding contest
The music video for "Falling Away" features top snowboarders Andreas Wiig (Two-time Gold  Medalist 07’ X Games, Honda Vail Session 07 champion, Snowboarder  Magazine Jumper of the Year), Hana Beaman (U.S. Open Champion, X Games Silver  Medalist, Transworld Magazine Female Rider of the Year) and Mike Casanova (Vans Cup Rail Jam Champion), JJ Johnson and Madison Elsworth was shot by  director Matt Ornstein in the middle of a snow storm in Keystone, Colorado. In the video, Raven sings and plays both the acoustic and electric guitar, together with DJ Ashba, while snowboarders performed mid-air snowboarding stunts. "Falling Away" is the first of Raven's songs to be part of a contest in which fans submitted clips of their snowboarding tricks for a chance to appear in the official release of the song's music video. Prize winners won attractive prizes including a prize pack comprising passes and products from Vail Resorts, Keystone Ski Resort, Vans and OIGO.

Raven stated in an interview with EssenSIE magazine that her boyfriend, Andreas Wiig, was the key inspiration for the music video concept. Wiig makes an appearance in the video as one of the snowboarders. Wiig and Raven married May 2013.

Track listings

iTunes version

"Falling Away" - 3:29

Promo CD (UK & Germany)

Break You
Falling Away
Here I Am

Promo CD (US)

Falling Away (Single Version)

Reception
 "Falling Away" peaked at number 5 on the Nicaragua music charts even though the single was not released in Central America.
 German website mix1.de gave "Falling Away" a 6 out of 8 rating.

References

2007 singles
Marion Raven songs
Songs written by Marion Raven
Songs written by Freddy Wexler
2007 songs
Eleven Seven Label Group singles